The Nokia 6500 slide is a mobile phone by Nokia. The phone runs the Series 40 platform. The case is made of brushed stainless steel. It is the slider version of Nokia 6500 classic.

Features
Communications
Quad band GSM / GPRS / EDGE: GSM 850, GSM 900, GSM 1800, GSM 1900
 Dual band UMTS (W-CDMA): UMTS 850, UMTS 2100

Media
Music player supports MP3, MP4, AAC, eAAC+, and WMA audio formats.
Video playback supports QVGA for H.263, MPEG4, and QCIF for H264 formats and codecs.
Video streaming supports H.263 & MPEG4 (up to QVGA, 15 frame/s), and H.264 (QCIF 15 frame/s) formats.
FM Radio
Camera
3.2-megapixel Carl Zeiss AG Optics camera, with video recording (VGA 15 frame/s)
Takes photos up to 2048x1536
Integrated double LED flash
Secondary camera for video calling (QCIF resolution, 15 frame/s)
Display
2.2" (240 × 320 pixels) QVGA LCD display supporting up to 16.7 million true colors 
Connectivity
Micro USB 2.0
Bluetooth version 2.0 with A2DP
2.5mm AV connector for headset and TV-Out (cable included)
Remote SyncML data synchronisation via Bluetooth
Browsing
WAP 2.0 browser with XHTML support over HTTP/TCP/IP stack
Opera Mini browser
Memory
32 MB SDRAM for running OS & applications
64 MB flash ROM internal storage (20 MB user available after OS and built-in apps)
256 MB microSD (HC) memory card included as standard by Nokia, officially expandable up to 4 GB microSD(HC) memory card and as of 2012 tested supporting up to 32 GB microSD (HC) memory card (unofficial)
Power Management
BP-5M Battery
Up to 6 hrs talk time
Up to 13 days standby time
900 mAh BP-5M

References

6500 slide
Slider phones